The Twelve Metal Colossi (Chinese:十二金人) were twelve metal statues cast after 221 BCE by the order of Qin Shi Huang, the first Emperor of China. After defeating the other six Warring States during Qin's wars of unification, Qin Shi Huang had their weapons collected and melted them down to be recast as bells and statues. Particularly noteworthy among them were twelve human statues, each said to have weighed a thousand dan (picul).

Near the end of the Han dynasty, around 190 CE, Dong Zhuo melted down nine of the statues along with other metal items and recast them into coins to finance a personal castle in Mei County near Chang'an. All copper cash became devalued since the new coins did not weigh the same, had no defined edge, or stated value.

See also
Colossus of Rhodes

References

Bibliography

12 (number)
Buildings and structures completed in the 3rd century BC
Chinese sculpture
Qin dynasty
Colossal statues in China
Bronze sculptures in China